Yaksa or Yaksha may refer to:

 Yaksa (band), Chinese rock band
 Yaksha (Sanskrit Yakṣa), a nature-spirit in Hinduism, Jainism, and Buddhism
 Yaksha Kingdom, an ancient kingdom in Indian epic literature
 Yakkha (disambiguation), also called "Yaksa-sh"
 Albazin, a village in Russia that was once named Yagsi (Yaksa in Manchu)

See also
 
 
 Yakusa
 Yakshini, also called Yaksis
 Yak (disambiguation)
 Yaxa, an automobile make